Picture The Impossible was an alternate reality game that was developed jointly between the Lab for Social Computing of the Rochester Institute of Technology and the Democrat and Chronicle newspaper. The game engaged players to explore and learn about the city of Rochester through the community-based game.

The game began on September 12, 2009 and ended on October 31, 2009. Approximately 2,500 players participated in the game, splitting into 3 different "factions", each representing a separate charity.

Development 
The game was developed as a joint venture between the Rochester Institute of Technology and the Democrat and Chronicle newspaper, with Elizabeth Lawley representing RIT and Traci Bauer representing the D&C. The two organizations created a development and design team that swiftly was able to build the game utilizing various technologies.

Factions

The Forge 
"The Forge is the competitor, the toughened steel. The hammer strike only makes all better, stronger. Rebuilding the world and making it greater than before."

The smallest faction, The Forge concentrated on teamwork to solve puzzles, crypted documents, and games. Their associated charity was Foodlink.

The Tree 
"The Tree is the achiever, the growing life. Trees come from a tiny seed and then stand tall to define the skyline, making life better and fuller for all. Do you seek to become more?"

The largest faction, The Tree focused on finding ways to solve the game's various puzzles. Their associated charity was Golisano Children's Hospital

The Watch 
"The Watch is the searcher, the exploring inventor. The innovator puts effort for justice and knowledge together like a well-built clock. Time is ticking."

The middle faction, The Watch focused on decrypting the narrative and various secrets hidden within the game. Their associated charity was Wilson Commencement Park

Gala 
The Picture The Impossible gala was held on October 31, 2009, celebrating the 150 players who obtained enough points to be at the top of the leaderboard. 1st place had a 13-way tie between players who obtained every achievement within the game. Additionally, the staff and persons who assisted with the game were also invited, including RIT's 9th President William W. Destler

References 

Alternate reality games